William M. Hixon (born September 6, 1957) is an American politician. He is a member of the South Carolina House of Representatives from the 83rd District, serving since 2010. He is a member of the Republican party.

Hixon is Chair of the House Agriculture, Natural Resources & Environmental Affairs Committee.

Electoral history

References

Living people
1960 births
Republican Party members of the South Carolina House of Representatives
21st-century American politicians
College of Charleston alumni
University of Southern California alumni